Kalabat is a town and Union Council in Swabi District of Khyber Pakhtunkhwa, Pakistan. It is located at 34°4'0N 72°33'0E with an altitude of 325 metres (1069 feet).

Kalabat town has its own union council. People are very friendly and live a happy life. Being a small town in Swabi District Kalabat has every modern day facility such as 24/7 transport, telephone, internet, bank, police station, hospital and schools. The people of this small town are hard working and the main source of income is farming. The literacy rate is high and people love to educate their young generation.

References

Populated places in Swabi District
Union Councils of Swabi District